Tomari may refer to:
Tomari, Russia, a town in Sakhalin Oblast, Russia
Tomari (crater), a crater on Mars, named after the town
Tomari, Hokkaido, a village in Japan
Tomari, Tottori, a village in Japan; dissolved in 2004
Tomari, Okinawa, a neighborhood in Naha, Okinawa, Japan
Tomari Station (disambiguation), train stations in Japan
Tomari-te, an Okinowan martial art